Skunk Records is a Long Beach, California based record label that was founded by Michael "Miguel" Happoldt and Bradley Nowell in 1990. The label also operates a subsidiary, Cornerstone R.A.S.

The record label originally produced records for Sublime and the Ziggens. The label also produces records for Long Beach Dub Allstars, Long Beach Shortbus, and Burn Unit.

On September 16, 2009, Suburban Noize Records purchased Skunk Records and its catalog for an undisclosed sum.

Artists 
 Sublime
 Awol One
 The Beautiful Girls
 Burn Unit
 Corn Doggy Dog and the 1/2 Pound
 Das Klown
 Del Noah & the Mt. Ararat Finks
 Falling Idols
 Filibuster
 Frank Jordan
 Juice Bros.
 LAW
 Long Beach Allday
 Long Beach Dub Allstars
 Long Beach Shortbus
 Jack Maness
 Mishka
 Monsieur Leroc
 Mystic Roots Band
 Pepper
 Perro Bravo
 Philieano
 Secret Hate
 Slightly Stoopid
 Toko Tasi
 Volcano
 The Ziggens

See also 
 List of record labels

References

External links 
Slightly Stoopid interview with Jarrod Dicker
Sublime official site

American record labels
Record labels established in 1990
1990 establishments in California